William Frick (November 2, 1790 – July 29, 1855) was a justice of the Maryland Court of Appeals from 1848 to 1851.

Early life
William Frick was born on November 2, 1790, in Baltimore, Maryland, to Anna Barbara (née Breidenhart) and Peter Frick. Frick attended Moravian College in Nazareth, Pennsylvania. He served in the War of 1812 as a volunteer during the campaign in Maryland. Frick then read law in Baltimore in the law office of General William H. Winder, gaining admission to the bar in that city in 1813.

Career

Legal and political career
His legal work was mainly in admiralty, maritime and insurance law. He was described as being "identified with almost every social and public enterprise of importance undertaken in the city". He was a presidential elector for Andrew Jackson in 1833, and in 1837, President Jackson appointed Frick collector of the Port of Baltimore. He was elected to the Maryland Senate, representing Baltimore City, from 1841 to 1846.

Judicial service
In June, 1848, Governor Francis Thomas appointed Frick as a judge of the Baltimore county courts and associate judge of the court of appeals, which offices he held until his election in 1851 as the first judge of the superior court of Baltimore City, where he remained until his death.

Personal life and death
On June 16, 1816, Frick married Mary Sloan, with whom he had six sons and two daughters, William Frederick, Elizabeth A., Mary L., Charles, George P., Frank, James Sloan and William. He lived at 182 North Charles Street in Baltimore. He died on July 29, 1855, in Warm Springs, Virginia, after an illness of only a few days. His widow survived him until 1865.

References

External links

1790 births
1855 deaths
People from Baltimore
Moravian University alumni
U.S. state supreme court judges admitted to the practice of law by reading law
Maryland state senators
Judges of the Maryland Court of Appeals